Stensen (cognate Steensen) is a Scandinavian patronymic surname meaning "son of Sten". There are various spellings.

Stensen may refer to:

 Henrik Stenson (born 5 April 1976), a Swedish professional golfer
 Nicolas Steno aka Niels Stensen (1638–1686) a Danish pioneer in anatomy and geology
 Sten Stensen, (born 1947) a former Norwegian speed skater
 Stensen, an American electronic music producer duo

Steensen may refer to:

 Steen Steensen Blicher (1782—1848), Danish author
 André Steensen (born 1987), Danish racing cyclist

References

Danish-language surnames
Norwegian-language surnames
Patronymic surnames